The Ireland national korfball team is managed by the Ireland Korfball Association (IKA), representing Ireland in korfball international competitions. 

The team is almost entirely made up from expatriates and those of Irish heritage, mostly from Great Britain and the Benelux, as there is no korfball set up within Ireland.

The squad is an all-Ireland team and uses Ireland's Call as a national anthem.

Tournament history

Squad rosters

National Team at the 2018 IKF European Championships in Friesland, Netherlands
 

 Emma Denton (Hind)
 Amy Freear
 Hannah Goodridge
 Abby Golding
 Charley Lewis
 Alicia Nolan
 Sarah Paine (Halpin)
 Lizzie Tighe
 Shay Conroy
 Terry Forde
 Sam Galvin
 Stewart McConvery
 James Norman
 Dinos Tritsarolis
 Sam Ward
 Ashley Yates

 Coach: Kees Verhoeven & Rinaldo Molenaar
 Physio: Arie van Loon
 Team Manager: Claire Woodroofe & Nora Goodridge

National Team at the 2016 IKF European Qualifiers in France 

 Katherine Smith
 Emma Hind
 Lizzie Tighe
 Aisling Mullins
 Hannah Parnis
 Sarah Halpin
 Hannah Goodridge
 Shay Conroy
 Terry Forde
 Konstandinos Tritsarolis
 Ashley Hind
 James Norman
 Niall Sheekey
 Nathan Berry

 Coach: Kees Verhoeven & Wilfred van Wijngaarden
 Physio: Arie van Loon
 Team Manager: Claire Woorddove

National team in the 2013 European Bowl

 Katherine Smith
 Emma Hind
 Jane Hutchinson
 Katherine Nelson
 Claire Woodroffe
 Ian Buckle
 Shay Conroy
 Terry 'Top of the Morning' Forde
 Peter M. Quinn
 Cathal Quigley
 Konstandinos 'Stavros Flatley' Tritsarolis 

 Coach: Kees Verhoeven & Wilfred van Wijngaarden
 Physio: Arie van Loon

National team in the 2010 Korfball European Championships

 Laura Blazey
 Rachel Camina
 Abi Cook
 Nora Goddridge
 Lucy Martin
 Claire Woodroffe
 Jessica Rowden
 Tom Brady
 Ian Buckle
 Shay Conroy
 Terry Forde
 Peter M. Quinn
 Seadna Quigley
 Konstandinos Tritsarolis 
 John Bracey

 Coach: Kees Verhoeven & Wilfred van Wijngaarden
 Physio: Arie van Loon

National team in the 2009 European Bowl

 Cara Allan
 Laura Blazey
 Rachel Camina
 Abi Cook
 Nora Goddridge
 Amy O'Neill
 Jessica Rowden
 Tom Brady
 Ian Buckle
 Shay Conroy
 Terry Forde
 Peter M. Quinn
 Seadna Quigley
 Konstandinos Tritsarolis 

 Coach: Tom Brady

National team in the 2007 European Bowl

 Anne Rheason 
 Cara Allan 
 Emma O'Connor 
 Rachel Camina 
 Cassandra Haggart 
 Sophie Cuene-Grandidier 
 Catherine Honeyford 
 Tom Brady 
 Ian Buckle 
 John Bracey 
 Nicholas Donovan
 Ryan Keaney 
 Michael Walsh 
 Peter M. Quinn  

 Coach: Tom Brady

References

National korfball teams
Korfball
National team